Godfrey is a given name and an English surname. The given name is derived from the Old French Godefroy, a name composed of the elements: the first being either god ("god") or gōd ("good"); the second being fred ("peace"). The name was brought to England by settlers from Normandy, the Low Countries, and France. The name is rendered Goraidh, Goiridh in Scottish Gaelic. In some cases the surname is derived from the Middle English personal name Godfrey, Godefrey; or the Old French Godefrei, Godefroi, Godefrois; or the Continental Germanic Godefrid. In other cases, the surname is derived from the Irish Mac Gothraidh or Ó Gothraidh.

Given name

Medieval
 Godfrey of Amiens (1066–1115), bishop of Amiens
 Godfrey of Bath (died 1135), bishop of Bath
 Godfrey of Bouillon (1060–1100), leader of the First Crusade, first king of Jerusalem
 Godfrey of Brabant (died 1302), Belgian noble
 Godfrey of Cambrai (11th century), prior and poet
 Godfrey of Chichester (11th century), bishop of Chichester
 Godfrey of Esch (11th century), Lord of Esch and crusader
 Godfrey of Fontaines (13th century), scholastic philosopher and theologian
 Godfrey (patriarch of Aquileia) (died 1194)
 Godfrey of Saint Victor (c. 1125 – c. 1195), French monk and theologian
 Godfrey of Viterbo (c. 1120 – c. 1196), Roman Catholic chronicler
 Godred Crovan (died 1095), King of Dublin and the Isles
 Gofraid mac Amlaíb meic Ragnaill (died 1075), King of Dublin
 Godfrey van Rhenen (died 1178), bishop of Utrecht
 Godfrey of Saint-Omer (c. 1100 – 1160), knight

Modern
 Godfrey (born 1969), stage name of Godfrey Danchimah
 Godfrey Agnew (1913–1995), British civil servant
 Godfrey Argent (1937–2006), English photographer
 Godfrey Ashby (born 1930), British Anglican bishop, theologian and academic
 Godfrey Baldacchino (born 1960), Maltese-Canadian social scientist 
 Godfrey Cambridge (1933–1976), American comedian
 Godfrey Darbishire (1853–1889), English-born Welsh rugby union forward 
 Godfrey Evans (1920–1999), English cricketer
 Godfrey Farrugia (born 1960), Maltese politician 
 Godfrey Fuchs (1889–1972), German-Canadian soccer player
 Godfrey Gao (1984–2019), Taiwanese-Canadian model and actor
 Godfrey Douglas Giles (1857–1941), English painter 
 Godfrey Goldsborough (1548–1604), English clergyman 
 Godfrey G. Goodwin (1873–1933), American politician
 Godfrey Grayson (1913–1998), English film director
 Godfrey Ho (born 1948), Hong Kong film director and screenwriter 
 Godfrey Hounsfield (1919–2004), English electrical engineer
 Godfrey Huggins (1883–1971), Rhodesian politician and physician
 Godfrey Imhof (1911–1963), English racing driver 
 Godfrey Gitahi Kariuki (1937–2017), Kenyan politician 
 Godfrey Kiprotich (born 1964), Kenyan distance runner
 Godfrey Kneller (1646–1723), English portrait painter 
 Godfrey Lagden (1851–1934), British colonial administrator 
 Godfrey Edward Madawala (1878-1932), Sri Lankan Sinhala lawyer and politician
 Godfrey McCulloch (1640–1697), Scottish politician and murderer 
 Godfrey McHugh (1911–1997), United States Air Force general 
 Godfrey Morse (1846–1911), German-American lawyer 
 Godfrey Mwakikagile (born 1949), Tanzanian scholar and author 
 Godfrey O'Donnell (1939–2020), Northern Irish priest 
 Godfrey Reggio (born 1939), American director of experimental documentary films
 Godfrey A. Rockefeller (1924–2010), American aviator
 Godfrey Vigne (1801–1863), English cricketer and traveler 
 Godfrey Walusimbi (born 1989), Ugandan footballer 
 Godfrey Zaunbrecher (born 1946), American football player

Fictional characters
 Godfrey Ablewhite, a character in the novel The Moonstone
 Godfrey, a character in Xenoblade Chronicles 2
 Godfrey, also known as Godric, a character in The Southern Vampire Mysteries novels by Charlaine Harris
 Gordon Godfrey, a supporting character and supervillain from DC Comics
 Godfrey, a character in the television series Taboo
 Godfrey, First Elden Lord, a character in the video game Elden Ring

Surname
 Albert Earl Godfrey (1890–1982), Canadian First World War flying ace
 Ambrose Godfrey (1660–1741), phosphorus manufacturer
 Arthur Godfrey (1903–1983), American radio and television broadcaster
 Ben Godfrey (born 1998), English footballer
 Billie Godfrey (born 1978), English singer
 Bob Godfrey (1921–2013), English animator
 Bob Godfrey (footballer), Scottish footballer
 Brett Godfrey (born 1963), Australian businessman
 Brian Godfrey (1940–2010), Welsh footballer
 Charles Godfrey (disambiguation), multiple people
 Dan Godfrey (1868–1939), British conductor, son of bandmaster Daniel Godfrey
 Daniel Godfrey (bandmaster) (1831–1903), British bandmaster and composer
 Daniel Strong Godfrey (born 1949), American composer
 DeWitt Godfrey (born 1960), an American modernist sculptor
 Sir Edmund Berry Godfrey (1621–1678), magistrate murdered in 1678
 Edmund Godfrey-Faussett
 Edward Godfrey (disambiguation), multiple people
 Frederick Race Godfrey (1828–1910), public figure and politician in Victoria, Australia
 George Godfrey (1853–1901), Canadian boxer and world 'colored' heavyweight champion
 Feab S. Williams (1897–1947), American boxer and world 'colored' heavyweight champion (better known as George Godfrey; named after Godfrey)
 Isidore Godfrey (1900–1977), conductor
 Kathy Godfrey (died 1981), American talk show host on radio and television
 Laurie Godfrey (born 1945), American anthropologist
 Marjorie Godfrey (1919–2003), Indian politician
 Martyn Godfrey (1949–2000), English-Canadian author
 Paul Godfrey (born 1939), former president and CEO of the Toronto Blue Jays
 Rebecca Godfrey (1967–2022), Canadian novelist and nonfiction writer
 Richard Godfrey (disambiguation), multiple people
 Robert Godfrey (disambiguation), multiple people
 Robert John Godfrey (born 1947), British composer, pianist and founder member of The Enid
 Steve Godfrey (disambiguation), multiple people
 Thomas Godfrey, multiple people
 Tony Godfrey (footballer) (born 1939), English footballer
 Wilhelmina McAlpin Godfrey (1914–1994), American tapestry artist
 William Godfrey (disambiguation), multiple people

See also
 Geoffrey (given name), a possible English/French equivalent
 Godfrey (disambiguation)
 Godfrid
 Godfried, a Dutch equivalent
 Gottfried, a German equivalent
Queen Goodfey, supporting character of Mysticons, in which she is the kind and brave ruler of the people of planet Gemina.

Citations

Sources

Anglicised Irish-language surnames
English masculine given names
English-language masculine given names
English-language surnames
French masculine given names
Surnames of English origin